Santiago Province may refer to:
Santiago Province, Chile
Santiago Province, Dominican Republic
Santiago de Cuba Province, Cuba
Santiago del Estero Province, Argentina

Province name disambiguation pages